The Waterman Tavern is a historic house and tavern at 283 Maple Valley Road, near Whaley's Hollow in Coventry, Rhode Island.  The -story wood-frame house was built before 1747 by John Waterman, who was licensed to operate a tavern on the premises in that year. It is five bays wide with a central chimney.  The site was advantageously located on what was then the main road between Providence and Plainfield, Connecticut. The tavern was a center of civic discourse, and town meetings were regularly held there until 1835.

The tavern was one of the first stops along the route taken by Count de Rochambeau's army during its 1781 march from Providence to Yorktown, Virginia, during the American Revolutionary War.  The main army camped near the tavern, while the officers were quartered in the tavern itself.

The building was listed on the National Register of Historic Places in 1974.

See also
Route of Rochambeau's army
List of historic sites preserved along Rochambeau's route
National Register of Historic Places listings in Kent County, Rhode Island

References
Waterman Tavern- Historical Marker database - HMbb

Commercial buildings completed in 1744
Taverns in Rhode Island
Drinking establishments on the National Register of Historic Places in Rhode Island
Historic places on the Washington–Rochambeau Revolutionary Route
Buildings and structures in Coventry, Rhode Island
National Register of Historic Places in Kent County, Rhode Island
1744 establishments in the Thirteen Colonies